Mildred Shahian is a former international table tennis player from the United States.

Table tennis career
She won a World Championship gold medal in the Women's Team event at the 1949 World Table Tennis Championships for the United States.

She also won an English Open title.

Hall of Fame
She was inducted into the USA Hall of Fame in 1980.

See also
 List of table tennis players
 List of World Table Tennis Championships medalists

References

American female table tennis players
World Table Tennis Championships medalists
Living people
Year of birth missing (living people)
21st-century American women